The  2010 AFF U-19 Youth Championship was held from 24 July to 30 July 2010, hosted by Vietnam.  Only four teams will be participating, two teams from member associations of the AFF along with associate member Australia, and an invitee team from the East Asian Football Federation (EAFF).

Tournament 
All times are Indochina Time (ICT) - UTC+7

Group stage

Third place play-off

Final

Winner

Awards

Goalscorers 
3 goals
 Nguyễn Văn Thạnh

2 goals
 Eli Babalj

1 goal

 Mustafa Amini
 Benjamin Halloran
 Brendan Hamill
 Mathew Leckie
 Dimitri Petratos
 Kim Ryun Do
 Lee Ki-Je
 Natthawut Khamrin
 Pattana Sokjoho
 Ngô Hoàng Thịnh

External links 
AFF U-19 Championship 2010 at AFF official website

3
2010 in Vietnamese football
2010
2010
2010 in Australian soccer
2010 in youth association football